San Bernardino Realino is a 20th-century, Roman Catholic parish church located on Via Alghisi in Carpi, region of Emilia Romagna, Italy. There is a distinct church dedicated to San Bernardino da Siena in Carpi.

History
The parish church is dedicated to St Bernardino Realino (1530–1616). Realino was born in Carpi, but his relics are now venerated in Lecce, where he died. He was canonized in 1947 by Pope Pius XII. The church building was erected in 1952.

References

20th-century Roman Catholic church buildings in Italy
Roman Catholic churches completed in 1952
Roman Catholic churches in Carpi, Emilia-Romagna